Makkal is a 1975 Indian Malayalam film, directed by K. S. Sethumadhavan and produced by M. O. Joseph. The film stars Jayabharathi, Kaviyoor Ponnamma, Adoor Bhasi and Jose Prakash in the lead roles. The film has musical score by G. Devarajan.

Cast
 
Jayabharathi 
Kaviyoor Ponnamma 
Adoor Bhasi 
Jose Prakash 
Sankaradi 
Bahadoor 
M. G. Soman 
Mallika Sukumaran 
Satheesh Sathyan

Soundtrack
The music was composed by G. Devarajan.

References

External links
 

1975 films
1970s Malayalam-language films
Films directed by K. S. Sethumadhavan